Andrzej Janikowski (1799–1864) was a Russian Empire ethnic Polish medical doctor and professor of theoretical surgery at the University of Warsaw, a pioneer of forensic medicine in Poland of the nineteenth century.

References

1799 births
1864 deaths
Physicians from the Russian Empire
University of Warsaw alumni
Forensic scientists